Haplogroup C-B477, also known as Haplogroup C1b2, is a Y-chromosome haplogroup. It is one of two primary branches of Haplogroup C1b, one of the descendants of Haplogroup C1.

It is distributed in high frequency in Indigenous Australians, Papuan people, Melanesian people, and Polynesian people.

Subgroups
C1b2（C-B477）
C1b2a（C-M38）Papuan people and other Oceanians
C1b2b（C-M347）Indigenous Australians

Frequency

C-M38

C-M347
Indigenous Australians 60.2%-68.7%

Migration history

Haplogroup C-B477 took South route after the Out of Africa through Indian subcontinent to Sahul Shelf. C-M38 was born 49,600 years before present around New Guinea.

References

C-B477